The , branded , is an electric multiple unit (EMU) train type operated by the private railway operator Tobu Railway on limited express services in Japan since 21 April 2017.  11 three-car sets (33 vehicles in total) have been built by Kawasaki Heavy Industries.

Design
The trains were built by Kawasaki Heavy Industries, with exterior and interior styling overseen by Japanese industrial designer Ken Okuyama. The driving cabs at each end of the three-car trainsets includes an automatically extending gangway connection to allow trains to be coupled or split en route.

The trains have active suspension, a first for trains operated by Tobu, and use permanent-magnet synchronous motor (PMSM) traction motors.

Naming
The trains are branded , a name derived from the English words "Variety" and "Liberty".

Operations

, the trains are used on the following services.

Exterior
The exterior livery consists of "champagne beige" with "forest green" and "future blue" (Tobu's corporate colour) highlights around the windows.

Formation
The fleet of three-car sets are formed as follows, with two driving motor ("M") cars and a non-powered trailer ("T") intermediate car.

The two motored cars each have one single-arm pantograph.

Interior
Each three-car set has a seating capacity of 161 passengers. Interior lighting is LED lighting. Wi-Fi and at-seat AC power sockets are provided.

The automated on-board passenger announcements use the voice of TV presenter .

Toilet facilities
Each trainset includes a universal access toilet, western-style toilet, and urinal, located in the centre car.

History

Tobu Railway officially announced initial details of the new trains on 22 April 2015.

The first three sets, 501 to 503, were delivered from the Kawasaki Heavy Industries factory in Kobe in December 2016.

The 500 series "Revaty" trains were a recipient of the 2018 Laurel Prize from the Japan Railfan Club.

Sets 509, 510, and 511 were delivered in September 2020. These sets' delivery was the final working on the Chichibu Railway Mikajiri Line before its closure.

References

External links

 Tobu press release (22 April 2015) 
 Kawasaki Heavy Industries news release (22 April 2015) 
 Ken Okuyama Design news release

Electric multiple units of Japan
500 series
Train-related introductions in 2017
1500 V DC multiple units of Japan
Kawasaki multiple units